The Chronicles of the Three Kingdoms may refer to:

 Records of the Three Kingdoms, a history of the Three Kingdoms period of China.
 Samguk Sagi, a history of the Three Kingdoms period of Korea.

See also
 Romance of the Three Kingdoms